Chestnut Grove Academy is an 11–19 mixed partially selective secondary school with academy and Visual Arts College status in Balham, London, England. Its most famous alumnus is pop singer Adele, who attended from a young age.

History
It was formed as Chestnut Grove School in September 1986 by the amalgamation of Henry Thornton School (named for Henry Thornton) and Hydeburn School.

It selects 40% of its pupils for places based on aptitude in art and design or language. It was the first Arts College in the United Kingdom.

Alumni 
 Adele, singer and songwriter
 Jade Johnson, retired track and field athlete

References

)

Academies in the London Borough of Wandsworth
Secondary schools in the London Borough of Wandsworth
Balham
Educational institutions established in 1986
1986 establishments in England
Specialist arts colleges in England